UE Engordany, an Andorran football club, has played in European football since 2018, in the Europa League.

Overall record
Accurate as of 18 August 2020

Matches

References

External links 

 UEFA Profile – Engordany

Football in Andorra